Three ships of the United States Navy have been named Saugus: 

 , Canonicus-class single-turret monitor
 , an Osage-class vehicle landing ship which served during World War II
 , Natick-class tugboat

United States Navy ship names